Atiwa is one of the constituencies represented in the Parliament of Ghana. It elects one Member of Parliament (MP) by the first past the post system of election. Atiwa is located in the Atiwa district  of the Eastern Region of Ghana.

Boundaries 
The constituency is located within the Atiwa District of the Eastern Region of Ghana.

Members of Parliament

Elections
A by-election was scheduled for 31 August 2010 following the death of Kwasi Annoh Ankama, NPP MP for Atiwa. He died during a trip to London. Kwesi Amoako Atta also of the NPP, won the seat with a vote of 20,282 (75%). This gave him a majority of 14,092 (52.1%).

See also
List of Ghana Parliament constituencies

References

External links and sources
Adam Carr's Election Archives

Parliamentary constituencies in the Eastern Region (Ghana)